Sha Po Tsuen is a walled village in Kam Tin, Yuen Long District, Hong Kong.

Administration
Sha Po Tsuen is a recognized village under the New Territories Small House Policy.

Education
Sha Po is in Primary One Admission (POA) School Net 74. Within the school net are multiple aided schools (operated independently but funded with government money) and one government school: Yuen Long Government Primary School (元朗官立小學).

See also
 Walled villages of Hong Kong

References

External links

 Delineation of area of existing village Sha Po Tsuen (Kam Tin) for election of resident representative (2019 to 2022)

Walled villages of Hong Kong
Kam Tin
Villages in Yuen Long District, Hong Kong